"Strong" is an American political advertisement that aired on television as part of Rick Perry's 2012 presidential campaign. The advertisement was broadcast in December 2011 for the 2012 Republican Party presidential primaries.

The ad was targeted at Christian, socially conservative voters. It raised controversy for addressing gay people in the military and religion in public schools, largely due to Perry's disapproval of the former.

The video went viral and inspired a number of parodies. During the primaries, it became one of the most disliked videos on YouTube.

Transcript

References

External links
Video on YouTube
Video on YouTube (alternate link)

2011 controversies in the United States
2011 in American politics
2011 in American television
2011 works
American television commercials
Political campaign advertisements
Political controversies in the United States
Religious controversies in the United States
Political controversies in television
Television controversies in the United States
LGBT-related controversies in television
Religious controversies
Political Internet memes
Rick Perry
2012 United States Republican presidential primaries
Viral videos
2010s television commercials